The Other Mary is a 1927 novel by Scottish writer Bruce Marshall published by Hurst & Blackett.

1927 British novels
Novels by Bruce Marshall
Hurst and Blackett books